Charles Brittingham Burns (May 15, 1879 in Bayview, Maryland – June 6, 1968 in Havre De Grace, Maryland) played one game in Major League Baseball for the 1902 Baltimore Orioles. In his one at-bat, he hit a single. He batted and threw right-handed. He was brought in for a tryout after playing baseball in Hagerstown, Maryland, and had his one appearance on August 19 as a result, a pinch-hit single in the ninth inning.

He is notable as one of a very few major league players with one at-bat and a perfect 1.000 batting average.

Burns died on June 6, 1968. He was buried at Angel Hill Cemetery in Havre de Grace.

Sources

1879 births
1968 deaths
Baseball players from Maryland
Baltimore Orioles (1901–02) players
People from Kent County, Maryland